Dee Molenaar (June 21, 1918 – January 19, 2020) was an American mountaineer, author and artist. He is best known as the author of The Challenge of Rainier, first published in 1971 and considered the definitive work on the climbing history of Mount Rainier.

Biography
Molenaar was born in Los Angeles, California, to Dutch immigrant parents, Marina (van Paasschen) and Peter Molenaar. During World War II, he served as a photographer in the U.S. Coast Guard in the Aleutian Islands and western Pacific. In 1950, he earned a BSc degree in geology at the University of Washington, and then served as civilian adviser at Camp Hale and the Mountain Warfare Training Center.

Molenaar worked as a park ranger and mountain guide in Mount Rainier National Park, climbing the mountain over 50 times as a guide and on personal trips, via more than a dozen different routes including three first ascents. He participated in the 1946 second ascent of Mount Saint Elias in Alaska. He was a member of the Third American Karakoram Expedition, a 1953 mountaineering expedition to K2 in which the party became trapped during a severe storm. Along with "Big Jim" Jim Whittaker and Robert F. Kennedy, he was a member of the 1965 climb and first ascent of Mount Kennedy in the Yukon, named after John F. Kennedy.

His career with the United States Geological Survey took him to Alaska, Colorado, Utah, and Washington, until his retirement in 1983. On April 7, 2012, the American Alpine Club inducted Molenaar into its Hall of Mountaineering Excellence at an award ceremony in Golden, Colorado. He met his wife Colleen on Mount Rainier and they had three children together. Molenaar turned 100 in June 2018 and died on January 19, 2020, at an adult care home in Burlington, Washington.

Art
Molenaar painted in watercolors and oils. He is known for his impressionism-style art with mountain and desert landscapes the dominant theme in his works. He painted the highest watercolor in history, spending 10 days in a tent painting K2 from memory at 25,000 feet during a severe storm that hit during the 1953 expedition. With precious fuel for melting snow running low, his teammates made him drink the remaining water colored with pigments.

Bibliography
 
 
 
 Terrell, Karen Molenaar (September 7, 2018) Are You Taking Me Home Now?: Adventures with Dad p. 241  
 Terrell, Karen Molenaar (March 16, 2020) The Second Hundred Years: Further Adventures with Dad p. 243

References

External links 
Dee Molenaar Papers at The U of Washington Library
   Internet Archive: The Challenge of Rainier: a record of the explorations and ascents, triumphs and tragedies, on the Northwest's greatest mountain

1918 births
2020 deaths
American centenarians
American mountain climbers
American people of Dutch descent
Men centenarians
University of Washington College of Arts and Sciences alumni
United States Geological Survey personnel
Military personnel from California
Writers from Los Angeles
Writers from Tacoma, Washington